The 2014 International Cup of Nice was the 19th edition of an international figure skating competition held in Nice, France. It was held on October 15–19, 2014. Medals were awarded in the disciplines of men's singles, ladies' singles, pair skating, and ice dancing on the senior level, and in singles on the junior level.

Senior results

Men

Ladies

Pairs

Ice dancing

Junior results

Men

Ladies

References

External links
 Official site
 Starting orders and results

Coupe Internationale de Nice
Cup of Nice, 2014
Cup of Nice